Scythris adustella is a moth of the family Scythrididae. It was described by Jäckh in 1978. It is found in France and northern Italy.

References

adustella
Moths described in 1978